Sketches of Brunswick East is the eleventh studio album by Australian psychedelic rock band King Gizzard & the Lizard Wizard, and the third by Mild High Club. The title is a reference to the Melbourne suburb of Brunswick East and Miles Davis' 1960 LP Sketches of Spain, which inspired the album's jazz-oriented sound. It was released on 18 August 2017 by Flightless in Australia, ATO Records in the United States, and Heavenly Recordings in the United Kingdom. It is the third of five albums released by the band in 2017.

The album is a collaboration with Mild High Club member Alex Brettin, and is prominently jazz-based.

It was nominated for Best Jazz Album at the ARIA Music Awards of 2017.

Background and conception
The album was conceived just after the release of Flying Microtonal Banana and the completion of Murder of the Universe, the band's first and second releases in 2017. At that point, ideas for the next three albums were discussed, with one (presumably Sketches of Brunswick East) said to be in a "state of coming together," while the other two were "sort of distant at the moment."

Stu Mackenzie stated in an interview that the collaboration with Mild High Club came about because Alex Brettin, the sole member of the band, played at King Gizzard's own Gizzfest in December 2016. Afterward, Brettin stayed at Mackenzie's house for a few weeks, during which they came up with ideas that he has since described as "really, really vague." The two recorded a handful of iPhone voice memos to share with each other, which they ended up calling sketches: hence the album title. Mackenzie later stated that the album was recorded in three weeks.

The album's title was leaked in the Heavenly Recordings album biography for Murder of the Universe. The title alludes to Miles Davis' Sketches of Spain as a musical influence.

The track "Rolling Stoned" was first shown in a live performance by the Mild High Club featuring Stu Mackenzie almost two years before this album was even known to exist. The song was taken directly off a segment from the song "The Chat", which appears in Mild High Club's first album Timeline.

The album was first played in its entirety on August 18, 2017 on a Facebook live stream. The album was then available for purchase an hour after the start of the stream.

Genre
The album has been described as psychedelic rock, jazz fusion, psychedelic pop and soft rock.

Reception

Sketches of Brunswick East was generally well-received by professional music critics upon its initial release. In a four out of five star review for AllMusic, writer Tim Sendra claimed "It's fun to hear Gizzard being reshaped by Brettin's soft rock wizardry, and in the process making their third album of the year the most listenable so far. Conversely, working with the Australian wildmen gives Brettin's work an unpredictable nature not found on Mild High Club albums. This mutual benefaction means Sketches of Brunswick East is a collaboration that works wonders for both sides and will also make fans of both groups very happy." Pitchfork Contributor Saby Reyes-Kulkarni also felt the collaboration between both bands was a success, stating "Brunswick East amounts to way more than just a hybrid of two signature styles, or even a mere consolidation of each party’s respective strengths. When Brettin forays into 1970s AM tropes on his own, he can come off as if he’s being ironic, the line between sincere homage and smirking ridicule as hard to gauge as the commentary on, say, a podcast about yacht-rock. But when working around Brettin’s ideas, Mackenzie and his bandmates never linger too long in any one genre. As a result, the songs on Brunswick East have an endearing mutant-like quality about them that, for the most part, prevents them from turning into revivalist clichés."

Track listing
Track listing adapted from King Gizzard & The Lizard Wizard's Bandcamp listing of the album.

Vinyl releases have tracks 1–7 on Side A, and tracks 8–13 on Side B.

Personnel 
Credits for Sketches of Brunswick East adapted from liner notes.

King Gizzard & the Lizard Wizard
 Stu Mackenzie – bass guitar , electric piano , flute , wah-wah guitar , vocals , mellotron , microtonal guitar , acoustic guitar , glass marimbas , microtonal organ , synthesizers , piano , electric guitar ; recording, mixing , production
 Michael Cavanagh – drum kit 1 , snare brushes , maracas , floor toms , vibraslap , bongos , drum kit 2 , tambourine , cowbell 
 Cook Craig – electric guitar , fretless bass guitar , vocals , synthesizers , bass guitar ; additional overdubbing
 Lucas Skinner – mellotron , electric piano , piano ; additional overdubbing
 Joey Walker – microtonal bass guitar , shaker , glass marimbas , acoustic guitar , synthesizers , vocals , electric guitar , bass guitar , omnichord , piano , bongos , güiro ; additional overdubbing
 Eric Moore – drum kit 2 
 Ambrose Kenny-Smith – vocals , harmonica 

Mild High Club
 Alex Brettin – acoustic piano , bass guitar , electric piano , synthesizers , microtonal synthesizers , optigan , organ , electronic drum kit , electric guitar ; additional overdubbing, mixing 
 Andrew Burt – guitar 

Additional personnel
 Joseph Carra – mastering
 Jason Galea – artwork and layout
 Jamie Wdziekonski - photography

Charts

Weekly

Year-end

References

2017 albums
King Gizzard & the Lizard Wizard albums
ATO Records albums
Collaborative albums
Heavenly Recordings albums
Flightless (record label) albums
Jazz fusion albums by Australian artists
Soft rock albums by Australian artists
Psychedelic pop albums
Psychedelic rock albums by Australian artists